Catherine Englebrecht is the American founder of True the Vote and King Street Patriots, and a co-founder of The Freedom Hospital.

Education 
Engelbrecht has a bachelor's degree in marketing from the University of Houston.

Career and politics 
Engelbrecht was a small business owner and a parent–teacher association volunteer until Barack Obama won the 2008 United States presidential election. In 2008, after volunteering at the election, Engelbrecht began sharing her opinions about the US voting system, catching the attention of the Tea Party movement.

In 2009, Engelbrecht founded the King Street Patriots, naming the organization after the 1770 Boston Massacre. The same year Engelbrecht co-founded of True the Vote.

Politico named Engelbrecht as "one of the 50 political figures to watch" in 2012.

In October 2022, Engelbrecht, and True the Vote former board member Gregg Phillips, were jailed for contempt of court after refusing to name the person who allegedly gave them information about election logistics software company Konnech. Konnech was litigating for defamation damages after being accused of rigging the 2020 United States presidential election. Both were held in Joe Corley Detention Facility in Conroe, Texas.

Personal life 
Englebrecht is a mother of two children, a Christian and was aged 52 in 2022. She lives in Cat Springs, Texas.

References 

Living people
Women founders
Organization founders
University of Houston alumni
People from Austin County, Texas
Year of birth missing (living people)